Artur Manfred Max Neef (26 October 1932 – 8 August 2019) was a Chilean economist of German descent. Max-Neef was born in Valparaíso, Chile. He started his career as a professor of economics at the University of California, Berkeley in the early 1960s. He was known for his taxonomy of fundamental human needs and human scale development. In 1983, he was awarded the Right Livelihood Award for "revitalising small and medium-sized communities through 'Barefoot Economics'."

Career 
Max-Neef traveled through Latin America and the United States, as a visiting professor in various universities, as well as living with and researching the poor. He worked with the problem of development in the Third World, describing the inappropriateness of conventional models of development that have contributed to poverty, debt and ecological disasters for Third World communities.

In 1981, Max-Neef wrote From the Outside Looking In: Experiences in Barefoot Economics, a narrative of his travels among the poor in South America. In the same year, he founded the Centre for Development Alternatives (CEPAUR).

In 1982, Max-Neef won the Right Livelihood Award for his work in poverty-stricken areas of developing countries. Max-Neef ran for President of Chile as an independent in the 1993 election. He achieved 4th place, with 5.55% of the vote.

In 1993, Max-Neef was appointed rector of the Universidad Austral de Chile in Valdivia. He served in that position for eight years. He is also affiliated with the European Academy of Sciences and Arts, the Club of Rome, the New York Academy of Sciences, and the Leopold Kohr Academy of Salzburg (an institution founded by Leopold Kohr).

Among his honoraria were: the University Award of Highest Honour (Sōka University); Doctor Honoris Causa (University of Jordan); Chile's National Prize for the Promotion and Defense of Human Rights; and the Kenneth Boulding Award, the highest honour bestowed by the International Society for Ecological Economics (August 2008). On 10 May 2009, he received an Honorary Doctorate in Humane Letters and was Commencement Speaker to the 158th Graduating Class of Saint Francis University.

Max-Neef was a council member of the World Future Council.

Bibliography

References

External links 

Right Lifelihood Award website
World Future Council
Max-Neef on Human Needs and Human-scale Development
El desarrollo a la medida humana from Desarrollo y Cooperación (March/April 2002) 
Economic Investigation by Hermann Max, Manfred Max-Neef's father
Max-Neef: U.S. Is Becoming an "Underdeveloping Nation", a video interview by Democracy Now!

1932 births
2019 deaths
Academic staff of the Austral University of Chile
Candidates for President of Chile
20th-century Chilean economists
Chilean people of German descent
Development specialists
Members of the European Academy of Sciences and Arts
People from Valdivia
People from Valparaíso
University of California, Berkeley faculty
University of Chile alumni
21st-century Chilean economists